Pseudopalaeosepsis is a genus of flies in the family Sepsidae.

Species
Pseudopalaeosepsis mirifica (Silva, 1993)
Pseudopalaeosepsis muricata (Silva, 1993)
Pseudopalaeosepsis nigricoxa Ozerov, 1992

References

Sepsidae
Diptera of North America
Diptera of South America
Brachycera genera